The Early Years is a compilation album consisting of songs that were recorded by The Starting Line in 2001.

History

Also referred to as the "We the People Sessions", The Early Years is a compilation album consisting of songs that were recorded by band in 2001 prior to becoming members of Drive-Thru Records.  Some of the tracks appeared on the band's debut EP titled With Hopes of Starting Over, while others were re-recorded and included on Say It Like You Mean It.  However, most of the tracks leaked onto the internet before the band released any material and were subsequently not included on any of The Starting Line's eventual albums.  On October 31, 2012, Drive-Thru Records officially released the tracks in the form of a compilation album.

Track listing

Notes
Track 11, "Hold On", contains a hidden track which begins at the 5:51 mark.

Personnel 
Kenny Vasoli - lead vocals, bass guitar
Matt Watts – guitars
Mike Golla – guitars, backing vocals
Tom Gryskiewicz – drums, percussion

References

2012 compilation albums
Drive-Thru Records compilation albums
The Starting Line albums